The 1989 Triple J Hottest 100 was the first yearly poll of the most popular songs, according to listeners of the Australian radio station Triple J. From 1989 to 1991, listeners could vote for songs released in any year.

Full list

Artists with multiple entries

Four entries
Hunters & Collectors (2, 8, 83, 97)
The Smiths (7, 13, 27, 64)
The Cure (10, 19, 29, 66)
Elvis Costello (16, 58, 71, 73)

Three entries
The Jam (4, 75, 87)
The Go-Betweens (11, 72, 89)
Sex Pistols (17, 53, 63)
The Saints (28, 51, 78)
The Doors (40, 50, 86)

Two entries
New Order (5, 67)
Billy Bragg (20, 38)
Aretha Franklin (21, 92)
R.E.M. (22, 45)
Art of Noise (24, 59)
Talking Heads (32, 84)
Prince (34, 37)
Midnight Oil (57, 88)
Nick Cave and the Bad Seeds (70, 100)

See also
 1989 in music

References

1989
1989 in Australian music
1989 record charts